Rustam Zaynullovich Yambulatov  (born November 10, 1950) is a Soviet sport shooter. He won a silver medal in  Trap Shooting in the 1980 Summer Olympics.

References

1950 births
Olympic shooters of the Soviet Union
Shooters at the 1980 Summer Olympics
Olympic silver medalists for the Soviet Union
Olympic medalists in shooting
Medalists at the 1980 Summer Olympics
Living people